Piotr Wiśnicki (born 20 August 2003) is a Polish racing driver who is currently competing in the 2023 FIA Formula 3 Championship for PHM Racing by Charouz. He has previously competed in Italian F4 and the Formula Regional European Championship.

Career

Karting career 
Wiśnicki started professional karting racing in 2014, at 11 years old. During that time, he came in second in the Rotax Max Challenge Central-Eastern Europe in the Mini Max category. He came in 21st during the 2016 CIK-FIA Karting Academy Trophy. Wiśnicki competed in more Rotax Max Challenges from 2015 to 2019 but did not win any titles.

Formula 4

2020 
Wiśnicki made his single-seater debut during the 2020 Italian F4 Championship with Jenzer Motorsport. Wiśnicki was unable to score points throughout most of his campaign, until the round at Monza where he finished ninth on the road during the first race, before being promoted to eighth as Gabriele Minì was penalised. Wiśnicki added another points finish with sixth place in the second race, but was ultimately unable to complete the season. He finished the championship in 19th with 12 points.

2021 

Wiśnicki remained with Jenzer Motorsport for the 2021 Italian F4 Championship. His first point came at the second race in Vallelunga, before adding three more points finishes which including a high of seventh. Wiśnicki ended the campaign 23rd in the championship, scoring 15 points.

Formula Regional 
For 2022, Wiśnicki made the step up to the 2022 Formula Regional European Championship with KIC Motorsport, partnering Francesco Braschi and Santiago Ramos. In his first weekend at Monza, he finished 24th and 21st, the latter result his best finish in the championship. For the second round in Imola, Patrik Pasma stood in for Wiśnicki as he was to attend his school commitments. However, he returned to the next round in Monaco. Wiśnicki failed to score any points throughout the season and ended 35th in the standings.

FIA Formula 3 Championship 
For 2023, Wiśnicki was announced to be moving up to the FIA Formula 3 Championship with PHM Racing by Charouz, partnering Sophia Flörsch and Roberto Faria.

Karting record

Karting career summary

Racing record

Racing career summary 

* Season still in progress.

Complete Italian F4 Championship results 
(key) (Races in bold indicate pole position) (Races in italics indicate fastest lap)

Complete Formula Regional European Championship results 
(key) (Races in bold indicate pole position) (Races in italics indicate fastest lap)

* Season still in progress.

Complete FIA Formula 3 Championship results 
(key) (Races in bold indicate pole position) (Races in italics indicate fastest lap)

* Season still in progress.

References

External links 
 

Living people
2003 births
Polish racing drivers
Italian F4 Championship drivers
Formula Regional European Championship drivers
Jenzer Motorsport drivers
FIA Formula 3 Championship drivers
KIC Motorsport drivers
PHM Racing drivers
Charouz Racing System drivers
Sportspeople from Warsaw